Motley is the traditional costume of the court jester.  The word can also refer to the following:

People
Motley (surname)

Places

In the United States
Motley, Minnesota, a city
Motley Township, Morrison County, Minnesota
Motley County, Texas
Motley, Virginia, a census-designated place

In Australia
Motley, Queensland, a locality in the Toowoomba Region

Other uses
Mötley Crüe, an American glam metal band.
The Motleys, a family in the comic strip Motley's Crew
The Motley Fool, financial information and advisory service
Motley Magazine, a student magazine published in University College Cork
Mötley Records, record label
Motley Theatre Design Group aka Motley, a company that existed from 1932 to 1976

See also
Mottley